Isolation is the third studio album by American metalcore band The Browning. It was released on June 24, 2016 through Spinefarm Records. The album was produced by Jonny McBee and Cody Stewart.

Critical reception

Isolation received generally negative to mixed reviews from critics. Louder Sound gave the album mixed review and stated: "The ability to straddle the jarring genres of metal and electronica alone – and with conviction – is no easy feat, so when a band starts chucking in everything but the kitchen sink, cohesion can quickly give way to confusion."

New Noise gave the album 1.5 out of 5 and stated: "On their own, the 12 tracks that comprise Isolation aren't bad, per se, they just shouldn't be grouped together. As the record drags on, the listener is forced to relive the same sound 12 times with slight variation as if simply moving up in levels of an arcade game. The major issue with Isolation is that it seems more like an offshoot of an idea that founding (and only remaining original) member Jonny McBee came up with while playing with Garage Band and an N-64 in his basement."

Track listing

Personnel
Credits adapted from AllMusic.

The Browning
 Jonny McBee  – lead vocals, programming, guitars, electronics, production, mixing
 Brian Moore  – guitars
 Rick Lalicker  – bass
 Cody Stewart  – drums, production, engineering, mixing, mastering

Additional musicians
 Frankie Palmeri of Emmure  – guest vocals on track 11
 Thad Burmeister  – electronics

Additional personnel
 Austin Coupe  – vocal engineering
 Will Putney  – mastering
 Darren Dalessio  – A&R
 Dan Mumford  – cover design

References 

2016 albums
Spinefarm Records albums
The Browning albums